Transformers: BotBots is a Canadian animated television series based on Hasbro's collectable toy line of the same name, which is a spin-off of the wider Transformers franchise by Hasbro. The first season debuted on Netflix on March 25, 2022.

Premise
A shopping mall is struck by a mysterious Energon cloud, turning the various objects (including non-electronics) into tiny transformable robots called BotBots. Among them, a group of items that were separated from their stores of origin awoke inside the lost-and-found, dubbing themselves the Lost Bots. Lead by Burgertron, the leader of the Hunger Hubs, the Lost Bots dream to one day return to their original tribes, but after accidentally being spotted by the mall security guard (thus revealing the BotBots' existence to a human), they are treated as pariahs of the mall and set out to redeem themselves while discovering their own bonds and keeping away from many flesh beings.
squad, the Hunger Hubs. As Burgertron leaves for his squad, the Lost Bots want to join him to find their squads. When Dave comes out of the bathroom, Burgertron teaches the Lost Bots "The Sacred Rule of the Mall": BotBots must never reveal their bot forms in front of the humans. Burgertron and the Lost Bots ride a mall train to avoid getting seen by the Mall Guard. They soon ride the escalator and successfully arrived at the food court, which unfortunately alerted Dave. When Dave looks in the train, he sees Bonz-Eye, Dimlit, Kikmee and Clogstopper in disguise form. And when he sees Burgertron in disguise form, he attempts to eat him. However, Dimit changes back to bot form and jumps to save Burgertron, which unfortunately causes Dave to see Burgertron and Dimlit in their bot forms and see them disappear along with Bonz-Eye, Clogstopper and Kikmee, leading Dave to discover that BotBots exist. Spud Muffin, Ulf the Orange and the other BotBots later appear out of nowhere, furiated that Burgertron and the Lost Bots broke The Sacred Rule of the Mall, which caused Burgertron to be cast out of the Hunger Hubs, become a Lost Bot and be shunned by the other BotBots along with the Lost Bots. However, the Lost Bots weren't upset, they only cared about the other squads in the mall. Burgertron soon becomes the leader of the Lost Bots to attempt to reconcile the other BotBots.

Characters

Lost Bots
Burgertron (voiced by James Hartnett) – the leader of the Lost Bots and former leader of the Hunger Hubs. Burgertron is egotistical and constantly thinks of himself as a superhero-type character, despite his shortcomings. He became a Lost Bot after he and Dimlit got caught by Dave, leaving him to be shunned by the others. A large portion of Season 1 revolves around him trying to get reaccepted, though after Spud Muffin's deceptions were revealed he stayed with the Lost Bots, which were made an official squad. He transforms into a hamburger.
Dimlit (voiced by Deven Mack) – one of the first 4 Lost Bots who wants to join the Shed Heads. Dimlit is shy, nervous, and very reserved and easy-going, though he always pulls through when it counts. Much like Clogstopper, he is typically short on intellect, and with nothing to fear about his life prior to leaving the Lost & Found is generally very paranoid. He falls in love with another BotBot named Jacqueline in "Dimlit In Love", and transforms into a flashlight.
Bonz-Eye (voiced by Louisa Zhu) – one of the first 4 Lost Bots who doesn't come from any squad in the mall. Bonz-Eye is very bold and calm, but far more level-headed than her compatriots. She is an expert swordsman and material artist. She was also revealed to be lesbian, Japanese and the only one of her kind so she does not have her very own squad. She is also the Lone Wolf as she alter ego name. Unlike the other females, she is the only one that doesn’t have eyelashes. She sometimes likes to meditate. She transforms into a potted bonsai tree.
Clogstopper (voiced by Christian Potenza) – one of the first 4 Lost Bots who wants to join the Custodial Crew. Clogstopper is idiotic, goofy, awkward, and prone to making very relaxed, funny and goofy decisions and unintentional comedies that usually cause odd problems for his groups. He hopes to go to the Custodial Crew as his own dream, Additionally, he is very funny compared to the others in his favorite comedy, he even uses a hand puppet sometimes. Clogstopper is also interest in Fottle Barts. He transforms into a plunger.
Kikmee (voiced by Lisa Norton) –  one of the first 4 Lost Bots who wants to join the Jock Squad. Kikmee is the most energetic and excitable of the group and is comparatively hyperactive, always gets very excited and gigglish, and loves sports as well as winning. She hopes to join the Jockey Squad. She transforms into a soccer ball. Kikmee was a member of the Playroom Posse in the actual toyline, following her original planned release for the range. Her gender was also changed, with her original toy bio using male pronouns. She loves seeing Batsby from the Jock Squad too.

Hunger Hubs
Spud Muffin (voiced by Joseph Motiki) –  a former friend of Burgertron's. Spud actively sought to get rid of him on a permanent basis, and sabotaged the Lost Bots several times at their last chances at redemption and trouble, before being exposed for his crimes and exiled to the Dark Side of the Mall at the Season 1 finale. He transforms into a box of French fries.
Fottle Barts (voiced by Lisa Norton)- A member of the Hunger Hubs, she is the best friend of Ulf the Orange and always an nice and handy pal. Barts is also interested in Clogstopper. She transforms into a red-colored ketchup bottle.
Angry Cheese (voiced by James Hartnett) 
Hawt Diggity
Ulf the Orange (voiced by Josette Jorge) –  the love interest of both Burgertron (boyfriend) and Spud Muffin. She constantly shot down the former until Spud Muffin was exposed and exiled in the Season 1 finale, finally understanding his motives. She also gets angry or selfish sometimes at any risk or trouble in the mall. She is also a kind friend of Fottle Barts too. She transforms into an orange flavored juice box, and is based on a BotBot in the sixth wave of toys.
Brock O'Lonely (voiced by Devon Hyland) –  the DJ
Tappy Takeout

Jock Squad
Batsby (voiced by Sarah Hiller) –  one of the two leaders of the Jock Squad, she is the handy friend of Dinger and transforms into a Baseball bat. 
Kidd Klobber –  The boxer of the squad
Laceface (voiced by Louisa Zhu) –  A member of the Jock Squad, she is very brashed and cool to get many faces at once, she transforms into a football.
Pucksie 
The In-Sole
Dinger (voiced by Deven Mack) –  a member of the Jock Squad. He is both brash and bold and always too much confident as well, and transforms into a baseball.

Shed Heads
Cuddletooth
Nail Byter
Drilit Yaself
Sandy Man

Sugar Shocks
Frostferatu (voiced by Deven Mack) –  a member of the Sugar Shocks. He believes he has hypnotism powers and is a vampire bot, plus he loves hanging out with the lost bots, he transforms into a cupcake.
Sprinkleberry D'uhnut (voiced by Deven Mack) –  a member of the Sugar Shocks. He normally stands around and is typically seen usually, he cannot say any words like the other bots, he only says "BotBots" but says "Lost Bots" at the season finale. He transforms into a donut with sprinkles.
Lolly Licks (voiced by Lisa Norton) –  is a member of the Sugar Shocks in the Ruckus Rally. She poses like the reference of Sailor Moon, she is the only bot to have a single eye, She is also a kind friend of Lady Macaron and Burgertron too, She even is selfish sometimes. and transforms into a lollipop.
Sweet Cheat (voiced by Joseph Motiki) 
Wishy-Waffley (voiced by Cory Doran)
Lady Macaron (voiced by Julie Lemieux) –  a member of the Sugar Shocks. Macaron is known for being aristocratic and French, but is nice deep down if not a little rebellious at any time. She is a very close friend of Bonz-eye a.k.a the "Lone Wolf", during her adventure from the Dark Side of the Mall and the lost bots. She transforms into a macaron, and unlike most of the other BotBots, is not based on any of the toys.
Freezewich

Gamer Geeks
Game Over (voiced by Josette Jorge) –  a member of the Gamer Geeks. Game Over is one of the technology specialists amongst her squad, and she is one of the BotBots who covers up the tracks of their fellow beings at a very perfect operation to prevent their existence from being revealed. Game Over was characterized as a male member of the Lost Bots in the original toyline and transforms into a game controller.
Fomo (voiced by Cory Doran) –  a member of the Gamer Geeks. Fomo is one of the technology specialists in his squad, and he provides live footage through his lenses and a series of drones and soon becomes nice friends with the Lost Bots. Fomo was characterized as a female member of the Techie Team in the original toyline and transforms into a camera.
Snorg (voiced by JJ Gerber) –  a member of the Gamer Geeks who loves karaoke and refers to himself in the third person besides Pop N. Lock. He transforms into a cassette player in the original toyline and a karaoke machine in the netflix show.
Pop N. Lock
Steer'd Wrong (voiced by Josette Jorge) 
Chitter Click (voiced by Joseph Motiki) 
Ring-A-Ling (voiced by Ana Sani) –  Dave's company phone which turned out to be a BotBot that controls everything on herself. She is one of the few that’s not based on one of the toys.

Custodial Crew
King Toots 
Sgt. Scrubforce (voiced by Joseph Motiki) –  is the leader of the Custodial Crew and the army leader. He transforms into a bucket with a mop.
Caution (voiced by Christian Potenza) –  is an member of the custodial crew, he is even an nice person to all the bot bots, he tansforms into a slip hazard sign. 
Handy
Lady Loofa (voiced by Jacqueline Pillon) –  a member of the Custodial Crew, she is confident and transforms into a sponge.
Vomit Comet (voiced by Martin Roach) –  a member of the Custodial Crew. He is one of the more level-headed BotBots, though he also likes causing mischief. He transforms into a vomit pile.
Loose Deuce

Fashion Forwards
Ol' Tic Toc (voiced by Martin Roach) 
Jacqueline (voiced by Julie Lemieux) –  a shy BotBot from the Fashion Forwards and Dimlit's girlfriend. She transforms into a mannequin head, and unlike most of the other BotBots, is not based on any of the toys. She always gets calm and pleasant to see the Lost Bots as well.

Spoiled Rottens
Disgusto Desserto (voiced by Kyle Dooley)

Arcade Renegades
24K-Bit (voiced by Kyle Dooley) –  an arcaded token
Knotzel (voiced by Sarah Hillier) –  a pretzel

Science Alliance
Dr. Flaskenstein (voiced by Julie Lemieux) –  the leader
Face Ace (voiced by Paloma Nuñez) –  a member of the Science Alliance. She transforms into a pair of safety goggles.
Starscope (voiced by Sean Jordan) –  a member of the Science Alliance. He serves as the team's observer and a rapper and singer. Starscope was characterized as a female in the original toyline and transforms into a telescope.
Eye-Goon (voiced by Chris Locke)

Pet Mob
Anty Farmwell (voiced by Julie Lemieux) is a caretaker of her ants, she is seen with Dinger and Batsby, and she transforms into an ant farm

Top secret squad
Agent Smartlit (voiced by Raven Dauda) –  an agent in need of the lost bots and transforms into a flashlight because she is the same appearance like Dimlit.

Other notable BotBots
Playgor Cardquest (voiced by Brandon Hackett) –  a member of an unknown squad. He is known to the other BotBots for his troubador-styled singing, which often annoys those around him. He transforms into a stack of gaming cards, unlike the other BotBots, he is not based in any of the toys, along with Lady Macaron and Jaqueline.

Humans
Dave (voiced by Mark Little) –  the mall security guard who is aware of the BotBots. He only saw three BotBots in robot form: Burgertron and Dimlit in the series premiere and Spud Muffin in the season 1 finale. He is known for being severely incompetent and easily fooled, though the BotBots refer to him as a dangerous threat. He also looks after the lost bots in their object form with nothing at risk that he carries a flashlight.
Dave's mom –  Dave's mother. She is the only person Dave frequently talks to, and she is constantly disappointed at her son.
Randall –  Dave's boss at the mall.
Agent Wagner (voiced by Raven Dauda) –  an agent from Sector Seven sent to deal with the mysterious occurrences at the mall and meets Dave for a talk in the Goldrush Games.

Episodes

Season 1 (2022)

References

External links
 Official website
 Transformers: BotBots on Transformers Wiki
 

Transformers (franchise) animated series
2022 Canadian television series debuts
2020s Canadian animated television series
2020s Canadian comic science fiction television series
2022 Irish television series debuts
Canadian animated television spin-offs
Canadian children's animated action television series
Canadian children's animated adventure television series
Canadian children's animated comic science fiction television series
Canadian children's animated science fantasy television series
Canadian children's animated superhero television series
Canadian flash animated television series
Television series by Entertainment One
English-language Netflix original programming
Irish children's animated action television series
Irish children's animated adventure television series
Irish children's animated comic science fiction television series
Irish children's animated science fantasy television series
Irish children's animated superhero television series
Irish flash animated television series
Netflix children's programming